"Pretty Blue Eyes" is a song written by Teddy Randazzo and Bobby Weinstein. In 1959, it was a hit single for Steve Lawrence, and in 1960 for Craig Douglas.

Steve Lawrence version
In 1959, Steve Lawrence released the song as a single. Lawrence's version spent 18 weeks on the Billboard Hot 100 chart, peaking at No. 9, while reaching No. 7 on the Cash Box Top 100, No. 4 on Canada's CHUM Hit Parade, and No. 7 in Australia.

Chart performance

Cover versions
In 1960, Craig Douglas released a cover of the song, which reached No. 4 on the UK's New Musical Express chart and No. 12 in Italy. The song also reached No. 20 in the Netherlands in 1960, in a tandem ranking of Steve Lawrence and Craig Douglas's versions.

In 1964, Teddy Randazzo released a version of the song as the B-side of "Doo Dah".

In 1967, The Guess Who released a version of the song, which reached No. 48 on Canada's RPM 100.

Donny Osmond released a version of the song on his 1972 album Too Young.

References

1959 songs
1959 singles
1960 singles
1967 singles
Steve Lawrence songs
Songs written by Bobby Weinstein
Songs written by Teddy Randazzo
The Crickets songs